The 2016 Harlow District Council election took place on 5 May 2016 to elect members of Harlow District Council in England. This was on the same day as other local elections.

Results Summary

Ward Results

Bush Fair

Church Langley

Great Parndon

Harlow Common

Little Parndon & Hare Street

Mark Hall

Netteswell

Old Harlow

Staple Tye

Sumners & Kingsmoor

Toddbrook

By-elections between 2016 and 2018

Toddbrook
A by-election was held in Toddbrook on 28 September 2017 after the resignation of Labour councillor Rod Truan.
The seat was held for Labour by Tony Edwards.

Little Parndon and Hare Street
A by-election was held in Little Parndon and Hare Street on 8 March 2018 after the resignation of Labour council leader Jon Clempner. The seat was held for Labour by Chris Vince with a majority of 387 votes over the Conservatives.

References

2016 English local elections
2016
2010s in Essex